An election for Mayor of Carmel is scheduled to be held on November 7, 2023. Incumbent James Brainard is eligible to run for an eighth term in office, as there are no term limits for the office. However, Brainard announced he will not seek reelection.

Republican primary

Candidates

Declared
Sue Finkam, city councilor
Fred Glynn, former Hamilton County councilor
Kevin Rider, city councilor

Declined
James Brainard, incumbent mayor

Endorsements

Democratic primary

Candidates

Declared
Miles Nelson, city councilor

References

External links 
Official campaign websites
 Fred Glynn (R) for Mayor
 Sue Finkham (R) for Mayor
 Kevin Rider (R) for Mayor
 Miles Nelson (D) for Mayor

Carmel
2023 Indiana elections